Vöslau Airfield is a public airfield located  east of Bad Vöslau, Lower Austria, Austria. It is also known as Flugplatz Vöslau-Kottingbrunn in German. It is used for general aviation.

See also
 Transport in Austria
 List of airports in Austria

References

External links 

 
 

Airports in Lower Austria